The 1995–96 Tunisian Ligue Professionnelle 1 season was the 70th season of top-tier football in Tunisia.

Results

League table

Result table

References
1995–96 Ligue 1 on RSSSF.com

Tunisian Ligue Professionnelle 1 seasons
Tun